Platina or Platina Football Club is a Indonesian football team based in Merdeka Stadium, Kupang City, East Nusa Tenggara. This team competes in Liga 3 East Nusa Tenggara Zone.

References

External links

Kupang
Football clubs in Indonesia
Football clubs in East Nusa Tenggara
Association football clubs established in 2022
2022 establishments in Indonesia